Lawrence J. Christiano is an American economist and researcher. He is a professor of economics at Northwestern University, where he also holds the title of the Alfred W. Chase Chair in Business Institutions, and was chairman of the department of economics from 2016 to 2018. He previously taught at Carnegie Mellon University and the University of Chicago.

Education
Christiano received his B.A. in history and economics and M.A. in economics at the University of Minnesota, an M.Sc. in econometrics and mathematical economics at the London School of Economics, and a Ph.D. at Columbia University. He has been a visiting scholar at the International Monetary Fund and European Central Bank.

References

External links

CV
Lecture at NBER 7-21-2011
A collection of Lawrence J. Christiano's works

Living people
Macroeconomists
Econometricians
Alumni of the London School of Economics
Columbia Graduate School of Arts and Sciences alumni
University of Minnesota College of Liberal Arts alumni
Carnegie Mellon University faculty
University of Chicago Booth School of Business faculty
Northwestern University faculty
Fellows of the Econometric Society
21st-century American economists
Year of birth missing (living people)